Heo Yool (born August 29, 2009) is a South Korean child actress. She is best known for starring in the television drama Mother (2018).

Career 
In 2018, she beat out 400 other children to play the main character in the television drama Mother, which gained international recognition through the nomination in the 1st Canneseries TV Festival. Also she was the youngest in the TV category at 54th Baeksang Arts Awards and won Best New Actress.

Filmography

Film

Television series

Awards and nominations

References

2009 births
Living people
South Korean television actresses
South Korean child actresses
21st-century South Korean actresses
Best New Actress Paeksang Arts Award (television) winners